Jordan River Village is a vacation village in Israel for children with life-limiting conditions (serious illnesses, chronic illnesses, genetic diseases, special needs). 
The facility is located  near Giv'at Avni in the Lower Galilee.

History

The goal of the village is "to enrich the lives of Jewish and Arab children, in Israel and in the neighboring countries, suffering from serious illnesses and life-threatening conditions by creating free, fun-filled, memorable, empowering, medically sound and safe camping experiences".  After more than 10 years of planning, raising funds, working with the Israeli government, and building relationships around the world Jordan River Village began operations in August 2011.  The Village is part of Paul Newman's SeriousFun Children's Network, formerly the Association of Hole in the Wall Camps, a global community of 30 camps and programs for seriously ill children. 

The Village is modeled after the Hole in the Wall Gang Camp, founded in 1988 in Connecticut by Paul Newman. Newman played Ari Ben Canaan in the 1960 film Exodus, filmed in the same region of Israel as the camp is located.

The Israeli government contributed 20% of its budget. 

Israeli actor Chaim Topol served as chairman of the board.He described it as the philanthropic project to which he was most connected.

See also
Health in Israel

References

External links

 
 
 
 

Children's charities based in Israel
Summer camps for children with special needs
Disability organizations based in Israel